Muhamad Akhir Bin Bahari (born 22 March 1994) is a Malaysian footballer who plays as an attacking midfielder for Malaysia M3 League club DDM.

Akhir spent most of his career playing for Malaysian youth team Harimau Muda. He also have played for T-Team, and Kuantan FA.

References

External links

1994 births
Living people
Malaysian footballers
Malaysian people of Malay descent
Association football midfielders
Terengganu F.C. II players